Tim's Bio: From The Motion Picture - Life From Da Bassment is a 1998 album released by Blackground Records. Though nominally the debut solo album by hip-hop/R&B producer Timbaland, the LP is technically a compilation of tracks produced by Timbaland and often – though not strictly – featuring his vocals. A litany of guest stars appear on Tim's Bio, from Timbaland's "Swing Mob" partners Magoo, Missy "Misdemeanor" Elliott, Aaliyah, Ginuwine, Playa, and Skillz, to outside performers Nas, Jay-Z, Twista and others. Tim's Bio notably marks the on-record debut of Ludacris on "Phat Rabbit", later included on his major-label debut LP Back for the First Time (2000).

The music video for "Lobster & Scrimp" featuring Jay-Z premiered on January 4, 1999. It was shot in Las Vegas, Nevada, and directed by Timbaland (credited under his real name, Tim Mosley).

In August 2021, Blackground rebranded as Blackground 2.0, with Barry Hankerson remaining as founder. Blackground 2.0 signed a distribution deal with Empire Distribution, which will re-release the label's catalogue onto digital download sites and streaming services.  Tim's Bio: Life from da Bassment was rereleased on August 27, 2021.

Track listing

All tracks Produced by Timbaland with the help of Barry & Jomo Hankerson.

Sample credits
"Here We Come" interpolates the melody from the theme song of the 1967 Spider-Man TV series, written by Paul Francis Webster, with music composed by J. Robert Harris.

Charts

Weekly charts

Year-end charts

References

1998 debut albums
Timbaland albums
Albums produced by Timbaland